NGC 5979 is a planetary nebula in the constellation Triangulum Australe. It was discovered by John Herschel on April 24, 1835. The central star of the planetary nebula is an O-type star with a spectral type of O(H)3-4.

Gallery

References

External links

Triangulum Australe
Planetary nebulae
5979